Jagdishpur may refer to:

 Jagdispur, a subdivision of the district Bhojpur of the state of Bihar in eastern India
 Jagdishpur (Vidhan Sabha constituency), a constituency of Bihar Legislative Assembly
 Jagdishpur (Industrial Area) near Amethi, Uttar Pradesh, India
 Jagdishpur Reservoir, a reservoir in Kapilvastu district, Nepal
 Jagdishpur, Dih, Raebareli, a village in Uttar Pradesh, India
 Jagdishpur, Sultanpur, a town in Uttar Pradesh, India
 Jagdishpur, Bhopal, a villages in Madhya Pradesh, India; formerly called Islamnagar